Royal Air Force Theale or more simply RAF Theale is a former Royal Air Force station located south of Theale, Berkshire, England.

The following units were here at some point:
 No. 8 Elementary Flying Training School RAF
 No. 26 Elementary Flying Training School RAF
 No. 42 Group Communication Flight RAF
 No. 128 Gliding School RAF
 No. 2818 Squadron RAF Regiment
 Air Crew Disposal Unit

Current use
The site is now used as gravel pits and leisure activities.

References

Theale